A car ferry may be:

 In North American usage, a ferry carrying rail vehicles 
 In UK usage, a ferry carrying automobiles and other road vehicles